Sanfords Four Corners (also Sanford's Corners) is a hamlet in Jefferson County, New York, United States. The hamlet is in the town of Le Ray and is part of the Calcium census-designated place.

Notable person
Louis L. Jabas, Wisconsin State Assemblyman and farmer, was born in Sanford's Corner.

Notes

Hamlets in New York (state)
Hamlets in Jefferson County, New York